Morris Point is a point  east of Pearson Point on the south side of Bird Island, South Georgia. It was named by the UK Antarctic Place-Names Committee for Lieutenant (later Commander) Roger O. Morris, hydrographic officer in  during survey of Stewart Strait and approaches in 1960–61.

References

Headlands of South Georgia and the South Sandwich Islands